Lois Romano is a national journalist who was an editor, reporter and columnist for The Washington Post and Politico.

She is currently authoring "An Inconvenient Widow," a biography of Mary Todd Lincoln, for Simon & Schuster.

She was formerly the editor of Washington Post Live, The Post's editorial events business. In early 2015, she returned to The Post where she had a long career as a political correspondent and profile writer.
During her tenure at PostLive,  she raised the profile of the platform by linking it to the outlet's award-winning enterprise journalism and utilizing its deep bench of seasoned journalists as moderators. She also created the high value editorial content, such as the successful Pre-Game series before presidential debates, a news-driven morning event called Coffee@WaPo, and the Security Tomorrow," conversations with columnist David Ignatius. Working with engineers, Romano helped develop the platform's first App. Working with newsroom leadership in 2016, Romano arranged for the Post to have its first-ever political convention venues outside the official workspaces in both Cleveland and Philadelphia.

Before returning to the Post, she was the first editorial director of Politico events. She had been instrumental in shaping live editorial programming and content for the organization's dozens of issue-driven events, as well as its largest event series, Women Rule and What Works. On January 6, the Washington Post announced that she  "will report directly to Martin Baron. "

During her first career at the Post, she covered seven presidential races, served as a columnist, and was a regional correspondent based in Tulsa. Romano started at the Post in the paper’s acclaimed Style section, writing in-depth profiles on personalities like Jesse Jackson and Gary Hart. In 2004, she traveled with and covered Sen. John Kerry during his presidential campaign. In 2000, she wrote a seven-part biographical series for the ''Posts National section on George W. Bush. In 2007, a dozen women who had worked for Hillary Clinton since Bill Clinton's first presidential campaign, and were now running her presidential campaign, posed for a front page story written by Romano on "Hillaryland".

As a regional correspondent in Tulsa, she covered national issues including race relations, the fall of Enron, the death penalty, and both Oklahoma City bombing trials in Denver. In addition, Romano covered congressional and gubernatorial races.   
In 1991, she created and designed the Post'''s personality column, "The Reliable Source", which became a well read and high impact feature at the paper.  She was the first to report that Bill Clinton brought a high-priced Beverly Hills hairdresser onto Air Force One for a haircut.

In the spring of 2008, Romano was a fellow at the Institute of Politics at Harvard College and taught a study group on the general election.  In 2017, she joined the staff of the IOP as a strategic advisor.  She is on the adjunct facility at American University and has taught a variety of courses, including "How the News Media Have Shaped American History". In 2009, she was a fellow at the Hoover Institution at Stanford University.

After Barack Obama was elected president, she created the Posts video series "The Obama Era: Voices of Power" to profile American politicians who impact the political process.

On April 5, 2011, she left the paper for Newsweek/ Daily Beast. On February 6, 2012, it was announced that she would leave Newsweek/DailyBeast to join Politico as a senior political reporter.  Politico was started by her former Washington Post colleagues,  John F. Harris and  Jim VandeHei.

Personal life
Romano is married to Sven Erik Holmes, a former federal judge, who was also the Vice Chairman, Legal, Risk and Regulatory, and Chief Legal Officer for KPMG LLP, the global accounting firm. They have two daughters, one of whom is a national correspondent for CNN.

References

External links
 
 

American women journalists
The Washington Post people
Living people
International Center for Research on Women
Year of birth missing (living people)
21st-century American women